The International Composition Competition "2 Agosto" is a major composition competition in Italy. It was established in 1994 at the behest of the Association of the families of the victims of the massacre at Bologna Station on August 2, 1980.

The competition was created with the aim of keeping alive the memory of the victims, but at the same time to overcome the concept of mere commemoration, turning the day of August 2 in a creative and artistic response to the act of terrorism.

The competition is held under the High Patronage of the President of the Italian Republic and promoted by the "Committee in Support of Victims of Massacres", composed by the Municipality of Bologna, the Province of Bologna, the Emilia Romagna Region and the City of San Benedetto Val di Sambro.

The competition 
Since the first edition, the Competition takes place free of charge. No enrollment fees or contributions of any kind are required from any participant. The competition is open to young people around the world with rules that can change from one edition to another, but the age limit is usually placed at 35.

The competition announcement usually comes early in the year and all who want to participate are invited to send their score via computer within a predetermined deadline. The theme and type of works in the contest change from year to year.

The winners will see their work performed live in Piazza Maggiore in Bologna on the evening of August 2, as the final event of the commemorations of the Massacre.

The Grand Final Concert is recorded by the cameras of RAI, which deals with the television and radio broadcasting.

Jury 
The jury varies each year, but since 1994, there are many famous names who have succeeded in the role of President.

Some examples: Riccardo Muti, Ennio Morricone, Michelangelo Zurletti, Riccardo Chailly, Semyon Bychkov, Eliot Fisk, Federico Mondelci, Robert Beaser, Tania Leon, Michel Portal, Jacob Ter Veldhuis, Jesus Villa Rojo, Aurelio Samorì, Marco Tutino, Klaus Ager, Detlev Glanert, Domenico Nordio, Jesus Rueda, Gianvincenzo Cresta, etc.

Organizing Committee 
The Organizing Committee of the Competition August 2 consists of:

 Stefano Cuppi – President
 Bruno Borsari – Vice President
 Fabrizio Festa – Artistic Director
 Chiara Monetti – Consultant
 Maurizio Guermandi – Marketing & Communication

Pieces commissioned 
Pieces commissioned by the International Composing Competition “2 agosto” from 1995 to now:

 Marco Betta: Orizzonte, aria for violin and orchestra. Soloist: Cristiano Rossi
 Sergio Rendine: Exultate, for voices and orchestra. Soloists: Fausta Vetere and Antonio Romano
 Luis de Pablo: Vendaval, for symphonic orchestra 
 Carlo Boccadoro: Why?, for violin, piano and orchestra. Soloists: Cristiano Rossi and Danilo Perez
 Danilo Perez: Panamerican suite, for vibraphone, piano and orchestra. Soloists: Gary Burton and Danilo Perez
 Carlo Pedini: Le strade di Torquato, for percussions 
 Ennio Morricone: Non devi dimenticare, for reciting voice, soprano and orchestra
 Giovanni Sollima: Guitar Chemistry, for electric guitar and orchestra
 Larry Coryell: Sentenza del cuore, for two electric guitars and orchestra. Soloists: Larry Coryell, Al Di Meola
 Leni Stern: I see your face, for voice, choir and orchestra. Lyrics by Leni Stern. Soloist: Leni Stern
 Michael Brecker: African Skies (orchestration by Gil Goldstein), for tenor saxophone, choir and orchestra. Soloist: Michael Brecker
 John Psathas: Omnifenix, for tenor saxophone and orchestra. Soloist: Michael Brecker
 Fabrizio De Rossi Re: Slow Dance, for accordion and orchestra. Soloist: Ivano Battiston
 Tania Leòn: Horizons, for symphonic orchestra
 Françoise Choveaux: Fantasie Op. 122, for clarinet and orchestra. Soloist: Guido Arbonelli
 Michel Portal: Histoire de vent (orchestrations by Marco Biscarini and Daniele Furlati), for clarinet and orchestra. Soloist: Michel Portal
 Uri Caine: In memoriam, for piano solo. Soloist: Uri Caine
 Paolo Fresu: Venticinque anni dopo (orchestrations by Fabrizio Festa), for trumpet and orchestra. Soloists: Paolo Fresu, Cristina Zavalloni
 Fabrizio Festa: Clandestino, for voice, trumpet and orchestra. Soloists: Cristina Zavalloni, Paolo Fresu
 Nicola Campogrande: Absolut, new version for cello, electric bass and orchestra. Soloists: Robert Cohen, Angelo Liziero
 Lorenzo Ferrero: 2 Agosto. Prima variazione, part of Varizioni su un tema di Banchieri per organo e orchestra. Soloist: Roberto Marini
 Gianvincenzo Cresta: A Miriam. Con la punta delle dita, part of Varizioni su un tema di Banchieri per organo e orchestra. Soloist: Roberto Marini
 Alberto Colla: Ricordo, part of Varizioni su un tema di Banchieri per organo e orchestra. Soloist: Roberto Marini
 Bryan Johanson: Fresco, part of Varizioni su un tema di Banchieri per organo e orchestra. Soloist: Roberto Marini
 Tatsuji Toyozumi: Voices – Little Things
 Tomi Räisänen: Voices – Fortuna Favoris
 Pedro Ravares: Voices – Baião
 Simone Santini: Voices – La forza debole
 Michele Corcella: Raggi di un sogno nascente, for four ocarinas, clarinet, mandolin, fisarmonica, and ensemble synthesizers, electric guitar, bass guitar, drum kit)
 Roberto Molinelli: Zorn Hoffnung Gesang, for violin and orchestra. Soloist: Domenico Nordio
 Giovanni Di Giandomenico/Valentina Casesa/Roberto Prezioso/Giuseppe Ricotta/Giulia Tagliavia: Dedica – omaggio a Giuseppe Verdi, for soprano, mezzo-soprano, voice, baritone
 Claudio Lolli: Piazza Bella Piazza, arrangement and orchestration by Michele Corcella
 Cinzia Venturoli, Valerio Corzani and Fabrizio Festa: Resistenza
 Francesco Maggio: Di Morsi e Rimorsi
 Federico Torri,  Benedetta Zamboni, Jacopo Aliboni: Tre per Tre

The Winners

Commissioned pieces 
Some of the commissioned pieces by the organizers and performed out of Competition during the Concerto in Piazza Maggiore
 Marco Betta - Orizzonte - Aria per violin and orchestra - Solista: Cristiano Rossi
 Sergio Rendine - Exultate - per voci popolari, and orchestra - Solisti: Fausta Vetere and Antonio Romano
 Luis de Pablo - Vendaval - per symphonic orchestra
 Carlo Boccadoro - Why? - per violin, piano and orchestra - Solisti: Cristiano Rossi Danilo Perez
 Danilo Perez - Panamerican suite - per vibraphone, piano and orchestra - Solisti: Gary Burton, Danilo Perez
 Carlo Pedini - Le strade di Torquato - per percussions -
 Ennio Morricone - Non devi dimenticare - per reciting voice, soprano and orchestra
 Giovanni Sollima - Guitar Chemistry - per electric guitar and orchestra
 Larry Coryell - Sentenza del Cuore - per two electric guitars and orchestra - Solisti: Larry Coryell, Al Di Meola
 Leni Stern - I see your face - per voice, choir and orchestra - lyrics by Leni Stern - Solista: Leni Stern
 Michael Brecker - African Skies - (orchestration: Gil Goldstein) - per tenor saxophone, choir and orchestra - Solista: Michael Brecker
 John Psathas - Omnifenix - per tenor saxophone and orchestra - Solista: Michael Brecker
 Fabrizio De Rossi Re - Slow Dance - per accordion and orchestra - Solista: Ivano Battiston
 Tania Leòn - Horizons - per symphonic orchestra
 Françoise Choveaux - Fantasie op. 122 - per clarinet and orchestra - Solista: Guido Arbonelli
 Michel Portal - Histoire de vent - (orchestrations: Marco Biscarini and Daniele Furlati) - per clarinet and orchestra - Solista: Michel Portal
 Uri Caine - In memoriam - per piano solo - Solista: Uri Caine
 Paolo Fresu - Venticinque anni dopo - (orchestrations: Fabrizio Festa) - per trumpet and orchestra: Solisti: Paolo Fresu, Cristina Zavalloni
 Fabrizio Festa - Clandestino - per voice, trumpet and orchestra - Solisti: Cristina Zavalloni, Paolo Fresu
 Nicola Campogrande - Absolut - new version per cello, electric bass and orchestra - Solisti: Robert Cohen, Angelo Liziero
 Lorenzo Ferrero - 2 Agosto. Prima variazione - Varizioni su un tema di Banchieri per organo e orchestra. Solista: Roberto Marini
 Gianvincenzo Cresta - A Miriam. Con la punta delle dita.. - Varizioni su un tema di Banchieri per organo e orchestra. Solista: Roberto Marini
 Alberto Colla - Ricordo - Varizioni su un tema di Banchieri per organo e orchestra. Solista: Roberto Marini
 Bryan Johanson - Fresco - Varizioni su un tema di Banchieri per organo e orchestra. Solista: Roberto Marini
 Tatsuji Toyozumi - Voices - Little Things
 Tomi Räisänen - Voices - Fortuna Favoris
 Pedro Ravares - Voices - Baião
 Simone Santini - Voices - La forza debole
 Michele Corcella - Raggi di un sogno nascente - per quattro ocarine, clarinetto, mandolino, fisarmonica ed ensemble (sintetizzatori, chitarra electrica, basso electrico, batteria)
 Roberto Molinelli -“Zorn Hoffnung Gesang” - per violino e orchestra Solista: Domenico Nordio
 Giovanni Di Giandomenico/Valentina Casesa/Roberto Prezioso/Giuseppe Ricotta/Giulia Tagliavia “Dedica - omaggio a Giuseppe Verdi” - per soprano, mezzo-soprano, voce, baritono
 Claudio Lolli – Piazza Bella Piazza Arrangiamento e orchestrazione di Michele Corcella
 Cinzia Venturoli, Valerio Corzani e Fabrizio Festa - Resistenza
 Francesco Maggio - Di Morsi e Rimorsi
 Federico Torri,  Benedetta Zamboni, Jacopo Aliboni “Tre per Tre”

Artwork and image 
On the occasion of the XX Edition, the competition has undergone a restyling of the image that led to the creation of a new corporate logo and a new website through which users around the world can participate in the competition via internet.

For the past several years, each edition of the competition is associated with an artwork created by contemporary artists. The work becomes the symbol of the edition and it is on the cover of the libretto of the big final concert, which is held every year in Piazza Maggiore on the evening of August 2.

References

External links 
 Sito del Concorso: http://www.concorso2agosto.it/
 Sito dell'Associazione tra i Famigliari delle Vittime della Strage: http://www.stragi.it/
 Sito del Comune di Bologna: http://www.comune.bologna.it/
 Sito della Regione Emilia Romagna: http://www.regione.emilia-romagna.it/
 Sito del Teatro Comunale di Bologna: http://www.tcbo.it/

Music competitions in Italy
Culture in Bologna
Summer events in Italy